Dave Matthews Band Caravan was a series of concert festivals headed by the Dave Matthews Band (DMB). The four festivals, occurring during the summer of 2011, took the place of DMB's usual summer tour, after the band announced its intentions to take time off from touring the previous year. The first festival took place at Bader Field in Atlantic City, New Jersey. The second festival was at Chicago's Lakeside. The third stop of the DMB Caravan took place at Governors Island in New York, New York, but was rescheduled after Hurricane Irene hit the New York area the same weekend. On September 1, it was announced that the dates were rescheduled, while the venue changed to Randall's Island. The last stop was The Gorge in Washington. Each festival was three days long, with each show featuring a full set from the Dave Matthews Band. Various other acts performed on different stages prior to DMB's set.

DMB played a very diverse catalog at these shows, and also played many new covers, including Led Zeppelin's "Good Times Bad Times" and Aerosmith's "Sweet Emotion". DMB also widened their own personal catalog of songs by performing older, rarer numbers such as Kill The King, Shotgun, Joy Ride, and The Best Of What's Around. The set lists, as of Atlantic City and Chicago, had an almost climactic sense to them, with sets building up to the third and final night.

Bader Field
On March 9, 2011, Dave Matthews Band Caravan announced that its first performance would take place at Bader Field in Atlantic City, New Jersey on June 24–26. The lineup of performers was soon announced after, along with ticket information, lodging, and transportation suggestions.

Lineup
 Dave Matthews Band
 David Gray
 Ray Lamontagne
 The Flaming Lips
 O.A.R.
 Damian Marley
 Bassnectar
 Dr. Dog
 Amos Lee
 Thievery Corporation
 Michael Franti & Spearhead
 Warren Haynes Band
 Grace Potter and the Nocturnals
 Guster
 Lotus
 Rebelution
 Fitz and the Tantrums
 Carolina Chocolate Drops
 Lisa Hannigan
 Punch Brothers
 From Good Homes
 Delta Spirit
 Big Gigantic
 Alberta Cross
 Mariachi El Bronx
 TR3
 Vusi Mahlasela
 The Budos Band
 Bobby Long
 Dawes
 Pete Kilpatrick Band

Acoustic duo Dave Matthews & Tim Reynolds also performed a set during the Caravan. Carter Beauford and Stefan Lessard also sat in with some of the performers during their sets. Dave Matthews Band headlined all 3 shows with a full set.

Lakeside, Chicago
On April 7, 2011, Dave Matthews Band Caravan announced its second stop out of four on the tour. It was hosted in Chicago July 8 through 10 2011. This is the first event to ever be held at the site of a since-demolished steel mill known as the South Works, referred to by the Caravan as Lakeside.

Lineup
 Dave Matthews Band
 David Gray
 Umphrey's McGee
 Ray Lamontagne
 The Flaming Lips
 O.A.R.
 Edward Sharpe and the Magnetic Zeros
 Emmylou Harris
 Kid Cudi
 Amos Lee
 Summer Camp
 Liz Phair
Ben Folds
 G. Love & Special Sauce
 Sharon Jones & The Dap-Kings
 Gomez
 Drive-By Truckers
 Daniel Lanois' Black Dub
 The Jayhawks
 Michael Franti & Spearhead
 Soja
 Soulive
 The Wailers
 Blind Pilot
 Dirty Dozen Brass Band
 Alberta Cross
 Mariachi El Bronx
 TR3
 Vieux Farka Toure
 The Budos Band
 Jeff Coffin Mu'tet
 Ivan Neville's Dumpstaphunk
 Gary Clark, Jr.

Governors Island
DMB Caravan announced on April 21, 2011 that the third festival will be held at Governors Island in New York, New York. The concerts will be held August 26–28, and will feature various artists.

Lineup
 Dave Matthews Band
 Dispatch
 The Roots
 Gogol Bordello
 Trombone Shorty & Orleans Avenue
 Josh Ritter & The Royal City Band
 Bela Fleck & The Flecktones
 The Head & the Heart
 Vieux Farka Toure
 Robert Randolph & The Family Band
 O.A.R.
More artists are scheduled to perform at these concerts, and they will be disclosed in due time.

Reschedule and Cancellation

Due to the then-impending damages expected from Hurricane Irene, DMB Caravan was forced to cancel the Saturday and Sunday shows at Governors Island; the band still performed on Friday, along with all scheduled acts for that day. On September 1, DMB Caravan announced that the NYC Caravan stop had been fully rescheduled to September 16–18, and was relocated to Randall's Island. See below for more details.

The Gorge
On April 21, 2011, DMB Caravan announced that it would travel to the fan-favorite venue, The Gorge Amphitheatre for Labor Day weekend (September 2–4). This marks the sixth year that Dave Matthews Band will perform at The Gorge for Labor Day Weekend, and is the 16th year that they have performed at the venue.

Lineup
 Dave Matthews Band
 Dispatch
 The Roots
 Gogol Bordello
 John Butler Trio
 Josh Ritter & The Royal City Band
 Edward Sharpe and the Magnetic Zeros
 Blind Pilot
 The Moondoggies
 Lindsay Fuller
More artists are scheduled to perform at these concerts, and they will be disclosed in due time.

Randalls Island
On September 1, DMB Caravan announced that the postponed Governors Island shows were relocated to Randalls Island. The new dates are September 16–18, with DMB still headlining all three nights. Fans who purchased a three-day ticket to Governors Island will be permitted to attend all three concerts at Randall's Island. Single day ticket holders who purchased tickets for August 27–28 (who were also allowed to attend the August 26 show) were allowed to attend the Randall's Island show on either September 17 or 18, depending on which ticket was purchased. For three day Governors Island ticket holders who did not attend any shows, there is also an option for a full refund. A three-day ticket holder who attended the show on August 26 can receive a two-thirds refund. A new lineup of artists will be announced in the near future, along with other information pertaining to the venue and concerts.

Tickets
Tickets for the Caravan festivals were sold through Dave Matthews Band Warehouse Fan Association, as well as Ticketmaster. There were two types of tickets available for the DMB Caravan. One was a 3-day pass that allowed the ticket-holder entry to all three festivals; that was $195. The other option was a VIP pass, that allowed the ticket-holder entry to all three festivals. It also gave the ticket-holder access to a sectioned-off area of each stage, VIP restrooms, free snacks, beer, and water, and a dinner buffet. Warehouse members that purchased the VIP pass also received a voucher that allowed them to get one souvenir for free. The VIP passes were $825.

Payment plan
In response to fans complaining of high ticket prices, DMB Caravan released a ticket payment plan to help fans who wanted to attend the shows. The payment plan consists of three payments over a schedule of dates, rather than paying the full price all at once. The payment plan is for both the three-day pass and the VIP pass. The first payment contains all shipping and convenience fees, while the second and third are flat payments with no additional charges. The three-day pass (which is usually $195), is now broken into three payments of $65, while the VIP pass (which is usually $825), is now three payments of $275.

See also
 DaveMatthewsBand.com
 DaveMatthewsBandCaravan.com

References 

Dave Matthews Band
Rock festivals in the United States
Folk festivals in the United States